Forum or The Forum (plural forums or fora) may refer to:

Common uses
Forum (legal), designated space for public expression in the United States
Forum (Roman), open public space within a Roman city
Roman Forum, most famous example
Internet forum, discussion board on the Internet
Public forum debate, a type of high school debate

Arts and entertainment

Forum & Forum Expanded, a section of the Berlin International Film Festival
Forum (album), a 2001 pop/soft rock album by Invertigo
The Forum (vocal group), organized by American musician Les Baxter
Forum theatre, a type of theatrical technique created by Brazilian theatre director Augusto Boal 
Forum Theatre (Washington, D.C.), a former theatre group

Buildings

Shopping centres

Foorum, Tallinn, Estonia
Forum (shopping centre), Helsinki, Finland
The Forum (shopping mall), Bangalore, India
Forum Mall (Kolkata), Kolkata, India
Forum The Shopping Mall, Singapore
The Forum on Peachtree Parkway, Peachtree Corners, Georgia, United States
The Forum Shops at Caesars, Las Vegas, Nevada, United States

Sports and entertainment venues
United Kingdom
The Forum, Barrow-in-Furness, Cumbria, England
The Forum, Bath, an event venue and church in Bath, Somerset, England
The Forum, Tunbridge Wells, a live music venue in Royal Tunbridge Wells, Kent, England
O2 Forum Kentish Town, formerly London Forum, a nightclub and live music venue in Kentish Town, London
United States
Broome County Forum Theatre, a theater in Binghamton, New York commonly called The Forum
FedExForum, an arena in Memphis, Tennessee
The Forum (Chicago), an event venue in Chicago, Illinois
The Forum, Los Angeles, former name of Kia Forum, an indoor arena in Inglewood, California
Tampa Bay Times Forum, former name of Amalie Arena, a multi-purpose arena in Tampa Bay, Florida
Other countries
The Forum, North Adelaide, former name of  the Piccadilly Cinema, a cinema in Adelaide, South Australia 
The Forum, Toronto, former venue on the site of the Molson Canadian Amphitheatre
Forum Copenhagen, exhibition, concert, and faire building in Copenhagen, Denmark
 Forum Theatre (officially Forum Melbourne), a live music venue in Melbourne, Australia
Mediolanum Forum, an indoor arena in Milan, Italy
Montreal Forum, a historic arena in Montreal, Quebec, Canada
Thessaloniki Forum, an indoor arena in Greece

Other buildings
Forum Restaurant, Sino Plaza, Causeway Bay, Hong Kong
Forum Station, a metro station in Copenhagen
Informatics Forum, on the campus of the University of Edinburgh
The Forum (Dubai), a future highrise tower in Dubai, United Arab Emirates
The Forum, Norwich, a library, tourist information office and headquarters of the BBC in Norwich
The Forum at 343 East 74th Street, a residential building in New York City
The Forum Southend-on-Sea, a library in Essex, England

Businesses and organizations

Forum (alternative dispute resolution), formerly known as the National Arbitration Forum
Berkeley Forum, a student organization at the University of California, Berkeley
Forum Group, an Australian company
ISKCON Youth Forum (IYF) Ahmedabad, a youth organisation
The Forum, a group involved in the origins of The Urantia Book
The Forum, a brand of self-help firm Landmark Worldwide
World Economic Forum, a Swiss nonprofit foundation

Events
European Forum Alpbach, held by a political and economic thinktank
OpenForum, a conference held in Cape Town in 2012
SCO Forum, a computer conference held in the United States from 1987 to 2008
Universal Forum of Cultures, an international cultural event 
World Social Forum, an annual meeting of civil society organizations

Media

Periodicals

Forum (Bangladesh), a Bangladeshi current affairs magazine
Forum (business magazine), Swedish-language magazine in Finland
Forum (Macedonian magazine), a weekly political magazine in the Republic of Macedonia
Penthouse Forum, an American pornographic magazine
The Forum (American magazine), published between 1886 and 1950
The Forum, an official magazine of Alcoholics Anonymous
The Forum of Fargo-Moorhead, a newspaper in Fargo, North Dakota
 The Forum, an online publication of the African American Policy Forum
 FORUM: Issues about Part-Time and Contingent Faculty, a publication of the National Council of Teachers of English

Places

Natural features
 Forum Peak, on the border of Alberta and British Columbia, Canada
Piz Fora, a mountain in the Alps

Populated places
 Forum, Arkansas, United States
Blandford Forum, town in England
Forum Fulvii, Roman settlement in Italy

Radio
Forum (KQED), a radio show on KQED-FM hosted by Michael Krasny
The Forum (BBC World Service), an international radio discussion show

See also
A Funny Thing Happened on the Way to the Forum, a 1962 musical
A Funny thing Happened on the Way to the  Forum (film), a 1966  film based upon the musical
Foraminifera, a phylum or class of amoeboid protists
National Forum (disambiguation)